The Nissan D-series is an overhead valve series of engines which first appeared in 1964, with the 1.05-liter D engine. Similar to a number of British and other Datsun engines, it may have been derived from an Ohta design which also found its way into some Kurogane vehicles - both of these companies were swallowed up by Nissan in the early 1960s.

D (D10)
The D type engine was introduced for the 1964 update of the Datsun Cablight (A122). This engine displaces  and is of an overhead valve design. Its internal dimensions are unknown, but the displacement is the same as the E-10 engine made by Tokyu Kogyo Kurogane from 1959 until 1962; this engine was originally developed by Ohta. The D engine, unlike other Nissan engines of the period, also has its distributor mounted between the second and third cylinders rather than towards the back of the engine. Kurogane was taken over by Nissan in 1962 and the Datsun Cablight was a continuation of the Kurogane Mighty, which had already used the E-10 engine in the Mighty NC model.

Applications
 1964 Datsun Cablight A122, A220

D11
Similar to the E & J series, and Austin A series in layout, it had a gear-driven cam drive similar to the larger SD series diesels; it was used in Datsun FG003 forklifts in the 1960s and then in the NFG101C-103C forklifts in the 1970s. These later industrial applications produce  at 2800 rpm.

Applications
 1964–1968 Datsun Cablight A220 & A221

D12
The D12 is a  version of Nissan/Datsun's D-series inline-four. Also an overhead valve design, it produces  at 4800 rpm.

Applications
 1968–1970 Datsun Cabstar A320

See also
 List of Nissan engines

References

D

Straight-four engines
Gasoline engines by model